The Philippine Super Liga (PSL; alternatively spelled as Philippine Superliga) was a non-professional corporate club women's volleyball league in the Philippines. It was first organized by SportsCore Event Management and Consultancy, Inc. and later owned by Athletic Events & Sports Management Group (ACES), Inc. The league was envisioned to provide former collegiate players a league with which they can continue with their volleyball career.

The PSL also had a men's division from 2013 to 2014, although its beach volleyball tournament both have a women's and men's division since its inception.

In 2021, the PSL was left without any active team after all teams either filed a leave of absence due to the COVID-19 pandemic or moved to the newly professionalized Premier Volleyball League, the PSL's rival league.

History
The PSL began as a women's league during its inaugural tournament.  A men's division was added for the succeeding tournament. After the formation of rival league Spikers' Turf, the men's division of the indoor tournaments became inactive.

The chairman is Philip Ella Juico (also the chairman of the Philippine Athletics Track and Field Association or PATAFA), while volleyball TV analyst Dr. Adrian Laurel is the league's commissioner. PSL founder and FIVB and AVC development and marketing official Ramon "Tats" Suzara served as the league's president from 2013 until 2018, when he resigned along with Finance Director Don Caringal due to alleged unauthorized misuse of the league's funds. PSL officials filed qualified theft charges against Suzara and Caringal in July 2018.

The league is recognized by the Larong Volleyball sa Pilipinas (LVPI), the International Volleyball Federation (FIVB) and the Asian Volleyball Confederation (AVC). The league maintains strong ties with the international governing bodies, adhering by the rules and regulations set by the FIVB and AVC. The PSL became a FIVB-accredited club league and its teams and players also became registered with the FIVB.

There were plans for the PSL to shift to a professional league as early as 2018, in anticipation that college players would be barred from playing in commercial leagues in the near future. With the PSL's rival league, the Premier Volleyball League (PVL) turning professional in 2020, the PSL made its position known that it does not intend to do the same, citing that the existence of two professional leagues don't make "commercial sense" and that it intends to be a platform for players aspiring to play in the professional level.

Due to the COVID-19 pandemic, its 2020 season was cancelled. This was followed by three member teams taking an indefinite leave of absence and one member team transferring to the PVL at the start of its 2021 season. The PSL was able to stage its 2021 Beach Challenge Cup in February 2021. However, following the beach tournament, the three remaining active member teams joined the PVL. As of March 12, 2021, the PSL is without any active member teams.

The PSL released a statement that it would still be active in sports development and maintained that the departure of its clubs to the PVL was done in amicable terms.

In August 16, 2022, Athletic Events and Sports Management Group Inc. (ACES), the management group behind the PSL, together with Shakey's Pizza Asia Ventures Inc. (SPAVI) formally launched the Shakey's Super League, a collegiate volleyball league consisting of teams from the University Athletic Association of the Philippines (UAAP) and the National Collegiate Athletic Association (NCAA).  This marks the return of Shakey's Pizza in Philippine volleyball after serving as the title sponsor for the Shakey's V-League (now Premier Volleyball League) from 2004 to 2017.

Media coverage
Solar Sports was the league's official broadcaster for its first two seasons in 2014 and 2015. while TV5 was the official broadcaster from the 2015 to 2020 season.

In February 2021, the league terminated its broadcast deal with TV5 following the transfer of the Cignal HD Spikers to rival league, the Premier Volleyball League (PVL), and Cignal TV's acquisition of a three-year deal for the broadcasting rights of the PVL. The league was in negotiations with GMA Network as its new broadcast partner when the three remaining active member teams transferred to rival PVL in March 2021.

Teams

Champions

Indoor volleyball

Beach volleyball

Awardees

Brand ambassadors
 Richard Gomez (2013)
 Gretchen Ho (2014)
 Charleen Abigail Cruz (2015)
 Mika Reyes (2016)
 Aby Maraño (2017)
 Rachel Anne Daquis (2018)
 Majoy Baron (2020)

See also
 Premier Volleyball League
 Shakey's Super League
 Spikers' Turf

References

External links
Philippine Super Liga (official website)
SportsCore Event Management and Consultancy, Inc.
Philippine Super Liga on Volleyverse
VBall DB (Philippine Volleyball Database)

 
Philippines
Volleyball competitions in the Philippines
2013 establishments in the Philippines
Sports leagues established in 2013
Organizations disestablished in 2021
Sports leagues disestablished in 2021